Robert Cullen Mahan (February 6, 1904 – March 5, 2000) was an American football player. He played college football for Drake and Washington University and in the National Football League (NFL) as an end for the Buffalo Bisons in 1929 and the Brooklyn Dodgers in 1930. He appeared in 20 NFL games, 15 as a starter.

References

1904 births
2000 deaths
Drake Bulldogs football players
Washington University Bears football players
Buffalo Bisons (NFL) players
Brooklyn Dodgers (NFL) players
Players of American football from Iowa